Theophilus Arthur Allen,  (1846–1929) was a British architect, probably best known for the Grade II* listed Dome Cinema, Worthing.

From 1880 to 1884, he was in partnership with John Mackland.

Notable buildings
Dome Cinema, Worthing (1911), Grade II* listed
Oak Hall, Haslemere (1911), Grade II listed in 2010
Kenwood, St. George's Hill (1913)

References

1846 births
1929 deaths
English architects
Fellows of the Royal Institute of British Architects